Hackness Martello Tower and Battery is a British Army barracks and museum located on the island of South Walls, in Orkney, Scotland.

History

The Martello tower, together with another on the north side at Crockness, was built in 1815 to protect British ships in the bay of Longhope against attack by American and French privateers, during the Napoleonic Wars, while they waited for a Royal Navy escort on their journey to Baltic ports.

The towers were upgraded, with the installation of new guns and other structures, in 1866 at a time of concern about the possibility of another French invasion.

See also
 Tally Toor, Leith

References

External links

 Hackness Martello Tower and Battery - official site at Historic Scotland

Towers completed in 1815
Historic Scotland properties in Orkney
Museums in Orkney
Military and war museums in Scotland
Forts in Scotland
Martello towers
Barracks in Scotland
Towers in Scotland
Artillery batteries
Hoy